Kilshanchoe/Kilshanroe is a village in north County Kildare, Ireland. It is on the R402 regional road, roughly midway between Enfield and Carbury.

See also
 List of towns and villages in Ireland

References

Towns and villages in County Kildare